Huillopuncho (possibly from Aymara willu (edible) cane of maize, punchu poncho) is a mountain in the Vilcanota mountain range in the Andes of Peru, about  high. It lies in the Puno Region, Melgar Province, Nuñoa District. It is situated south of Surapata and southeast of Sambo.

References

Mountains of Peru
Mountains of Puno Region